In mathematics, there exist magmas that are commutative but not associative. A simple example of such a magma may be derived from the children's game of rock, paper, scissors. Such magmas give rise to non-associative algebras.

A magma which is both commutative and associative is a commutative semigroup.

A commutative non-associative magma derived from the rock, paper, scissors game 
Let  , standing for the "rock", "paper" and "scissors" gestures respectively, and consider the binary operation  derived from the rules of the game as follows:
 For all :
 If  and  beats  in the game, then 
      I.e. every  is idempotent.
 So that for example:
    "paper beats rock";
    "scissors tie with scissors".

This results in the Cayley table:

 

By definition, the magma  is commutative, but it is also non-associative, as shown by:

but

i.e.

Other examples 

The "mean" operation  on the rational numbers (or any commutative number system closed under division) is also commutative but not in general associative, e.g.

but

Generally, the mean operations studied in topology need not be associative.

The construction applied in the previous section to rock-paper-scissors applies readily to variants of the game with other numbers of gestures, as described in the section Variations, as long as there are two players and the conditions are symmetric between them; more abstractly, it may be applied to any trichotomous binary relation (like "beats" in the game). The resulting magma will be associative if the relation is transitive and hence is a (strict) total order;
otherwise, if finite, it contains directed cycles (like rock-paper-scissors-rock) and the magma is non-associative. To see the latter, consider combining all the elements in a cycle in reverse order, i.e. so that each element combined beats the previous one;
the result is the last element combined, while associativity and commutativity would mean that the result only depended on the set of elements in the cycle.

The bottom row in the Karnaugh diagram above gives more example operations, defined on the integers (or any commutative ring).

Derived commutative non-associative algebras 

Using the rock-paper-scissors example, one can construct a commutative non-associative algebra over a field : take  to be the three-dimensional vector space over  whose elements are written in the form

Vector addition and scalar multiplication are defined component-wise, and vectors are multiplied using the above rules for multiplying the elements .
The set

 i.e. 

forms a basis for the algebra .

Non-associative algebra